Our Lady Of Refuge Church locals will call as Adaikala Madha Church is a 100 years old church located in Elathagiri village. This is the first parish church in Krishnagiri District. Every year Paara Koil celebrations are held, which are popular throughout the diocese. This church contributed a lot to the Catholic society by providing many holy people. As high as Twenty-five priests and more than a hundred sisters were given by Elathagiri parishes. Furthermore, the  Salem Bishop Rev. Singaroyan also belongs to this parish.

History

The Jesuit missionaries preached in  Kaveripatinam, Agaram-Barur, Maruderi, Uthankarai-Kanampatti, Maliampatti, Nellimarathupatti, Krishnagiri-Vennampalli, Mottur, and Anganamalai, which led to many people converting to the Catholics. After the decline of Tipu Sultan in this region,  Paris missionaries invited Catholics to settle from the above-mentioned village to Elathagiri. In 1782, Micheal Nayagam from Melvidhi-Maliampatti, which is near Uthankarai, was the first family to settle in this village according to Rev. Fr. Debian's record. In 1784, Thottam Chinnappan family from Nellimarathupatti settled in this village, according to the book Saruthira Surukkam, written by Salem diocesan priests. Before 1827, settlements were made from Ennampalli, Mottur, Kollapatti (near Vennampalli), Kaanampatti, and Maliampatti. In the book Saruthira Surukkam, many migrations are mentioned between 1780 and 1830. In 1859, Kovilur, Thirupattur became a parish after separation from Kovilur, Dharmapuri Parish. After that, Chapels in Elathagiri, Krishnagiri, and Krishnakuppam became sub-stations of Kovilur, Thirupattur Parish. 

In 1863, a Church was built in the name of  Our Lady of Refuge. In 1897, Elathagiri- Kadagathur became a deanery. Famous Pondicherry Missionary Architecture Rev Fr. Welter Dholsburg  MEP started the foundation process for this Church on 14-11-1900. But the church construction completed on 1922. During the time of Rev. Fr. Urmont  MEP, the church tower was raised and completed between 1949 and 1951.

Disease in Elathagiri

In 1904, Cholera started spreading across India during the time Elathagiri was also affected. Infected people went to the rock next to the village and started praying; after the prayers, they were cured. A chapel was built on the rock later, which evolved into a church, known as Paara Kovil by the locals. Every year Paara Koil celebrations are held, which are popular throughout the  diocese.

Education
An elementary school was founded in 1923 in the old church building as St. Guardian Angel School. In 1947, it was renamed as St. Antony's Middle School, in 1957 it became a high school, and in 1980 it became a higher secondary school.

Headmaster Rev. Fr. Joseph started a home for boys in the name of Saint Joseph in 1957. Later during the reign of Rev. Fr. Ignatius, a hostel was built in the name of Saint Aloysius.

Convents
On 19th March 1904,  Pondicherry FIHM sisters settled in Elathagiri in a house and began their missionary service. Later, in 1906, a convent building was constructed and they moved into the convent.

 FSM sisters started their service in Elathagiri in 1953 at the request of Rev. Fr. Joshua, in 1954 they built a hospital and started the service and in 1957 they opened a girl's hostel. 

By 1998, the FSAG Sisters (Franciscan Sisters of St. Aloysius Gonzaga) had established a convent in their neighboring village, Kathanpallam. In 2009, they established Gonzaga Arts and Science College for Women.

List Parish Priest

Sub Station Church

Also See
Roman Catholic Diocese of Dharmapuri
Vinnarasi Madha Church, Kandikuppam
Our Lady of Fatima Church, Krishnagiri
St. Antony's Church, Sundampatti

Reference

Churches in Krishnagiri District
Roman Catholic churches in Tamil Nadu